Vadu Oii may refer to several places in Romania:

 Vadu Oii, a village in Gura Teghii Commune, Buzău County
 Vadu Oii, a village administered by Hârșova town, Constanța County